Roland Bauchery, full name Roland Francis Bauchery, (17 September 1798 – 13 December 1863 ) was a 19th-century French playwright, chansonnier and novelist. 

His plays were presented at the Théâtre de la Porte Saint-Antoine.

Works 
1830: Chansons inédites
1831: Aux Armes... Français, aux armes...
1831: Le Faubourien, ou le Vrai patriote, with Pierre Ledru
1834: Le Bourreau du roi
1834: La Napolitaine, ou la Couronne de la Vierge, preceded by Deux Histoires à propos d'un livre by Michel Masson
1836: Didier, ou le Borgne et le boiteux
1836: La Fille d'une fille
1837: Un Héritage de famille, 2 vols.
1838: Mémoires d'un homme du peuple, 2 vols.
1840: L'Enfant de la pitié, drame-vaudeville in 3 acts, with Jules-Édouard Alboize de Pujol
1840: La Cardeuse de matelas, vaudeville in 2 acts, with Édouard Hachin
1844: L' Angélus, feuilleton
1844–1845: Les Bohémiens de Paris, 4 vols.
1846: Beaumarchais, historical drama in 3 acts, with Louis Cordiez
1859: La femme de l'ouvrier, preceded by an essai sur l'influence des romans moraux dans les classes ouvrières
undated: Un Ange gardien

Bibliography 
 Gustave Vapereau, Dictionnaire universel des contemporains, 1861, (p. 122)
 Pierre Larousse, Grand dictionnaire universel du XIXe siècle, 1865, (p. 383)
 La grande encyclopédie: inventaire raisonné des sciences, des lettres et des arts, 1885, (p. 849)

References 

19th-century French dramatists and playwrights
19th-century French novelists
French chansonniers
1798 births
Writers from Paris
1863 deaths